Kimse Okoko is the Pro-Chancellor of the University of Uyo and former President of the Ijaw National Congress (INC).

References 

University of Uyo people
University of Uyo
Year of birth missing (living people)
Living people
Place of birth missing (living people)